Candel may be:
 a surname related to Kandel
Sébastien Candel (born 1946), French physicist
Francesc Candel Tortajada (1925–2007), writer and journalist
Vicente Carlos Campillo Candel (born 1951), Spanish footballer and manager
 a Middle English spelling of candle 
 Candel Astra, or simply candel, an Uruguayan brand of candy

See also 
 Candle (disambiguation)
 Kandel (disambiguation)
 CANDELS